Semiran castle is a historical castle located in Qazvin County in Qazvin Province, The longevity of this fortress dates back to the Sasanian Empire.

References 

Castles in Iran
Sasanian castles
Castles of the Nizari Ismaili state